Fırat Sunel (born 1966) is a Turkish diplomat who serves as Ambassador to India. He was also the first-ever Turkish Envoy to Eritrea. He is also a published author with three books, one of which was adapted into a TV series.

Personal life
Sunel is married and has two children.

Education
He graduated from Istanbul University with a degree in law. He obrained an LLM from Bochum Ruhr University in Germany.

Career
Sunel has served at various diplomatic missions before his appointment to India as Ambassador.
Consul General of Turkey in Düsseldorf (2009-2013)
Founding Ambassador of the Republic of Turkey in Asmara (2013)
Founding Ambassador of the Republic of Turkey in Eritrea (2016)
Director General for Legal Affairs and Primary Legal Advisor at the Ministry of Foreign Affairs (2016-2021)
Fırat Sunel was appointed as Ambassador to India in May 2021. He also serves as Ambassador of Turkey to Nepal, Maldives and Bhutan.

References

21st-century Turkish diplomats
Istanbul University alumni
1966 births
Living people
Ambassadors of Turkey to Eritrea
Ambassadors of Turkey to India
Ambassadors of Turkey to Nepal